Jeff Jacobs is a former mayor of St. Louis Park, Minnesota.

Career
Jacobs became a member of the St. Louis Park City Council in 1991, and served as an at-large member until April 1999 when he became the Mayor. He served as mayor from 1999 until 2016.  He was succeeded by Jake Spano.

External links
 Jeff Jacobs' profile at the St. Louis Park Historical Society:  http://slphistory.org/jacobsjeff

References

1950s births
Minnesota Democrats
Living people